Dowlatabad (also Romanized as Dowlatābād; also known as Daulatābād) is a village in Farmeshkhan Rural District, in the Central District of Kavar County, Fars Province, Iran. At the 2006 census, its population was 622, in 146 families.

References 

Populated places in Kavar County